Hannah "Hanny" Nahmias (born April 9, 1959) is an Israeli actress, singer, author, television host and former children's star.

Publications
 Sodot neʻurim 2 : ahavot mistoriyot, 2001
 ha-Ḳupah she-meʼaḥore megerat ha-garbayim, 2011

See also
 Uzi Hitman
 Bli Sodot

External links
 

1959 births
Living people
Actresses from Tel Aviv
Israeli children's writers
20th-century Israeli women singers
Israeli film actresses
Israeli stage actresses
Israeli television actresses
Israeli voice actresses
Israeli Sephardi Jews
Israeli people of Greek-Jewish descent
Israeli women children's writers